Kambja Parish is a rural municipality in Tartu County, Estonia.

Settlements
Small boroughs
Kambja - Külitse - Räni - Tõrvandi - Ülenurme

Villages
Aakaru - Ivaste - Kaatsi - Kammeri - Kavandu - Kodijärve - Kõrkküla - Kullaga - Laane - Lalli - Läti - Lemmatsi - Lepiku - Madise - Mäeküla - Oomiste - Õssu - Paali - Palumäe - Pangodi - Pulli - Pühi - Raanitsa - Rebase - Reola - Reolasoo - Riiviku - Sipe - Sirvaku -  Soinaste -  Soosilla - Sulu - Suure-Kambja - Talvikese - Tatra - Täsvere - Uhti - Vana-Kuuste - Virulase - Visnapuu

Religion

Twinnings
 Toivakka Municipality, Finland

References

External links